The National Peace Jubilee was a celebration that commemorated the end of the American Civil War, organized by Patrick Gilmore in Boston from June 15-19, 1869. It featured an orchestra and a chorus, as well as numerous soloists. More than 11,000 performers participated, including the famous violinist Ole Bull as the orchestra's concertmaster, and Carl Zerrahn as director of the choral forces. The Jubilee became the "high-water mark in the influence of the band in American life". Along with the World's Peace Jubilee and International Musical Festival in 1872, it made Gilmore a famous composer and bandmaster. For the Jubilee, a newly commissioned "Hymn of Peace" was written by Dr. Oliver Wendell Holmes, set to the music from "American Hymn" by Matthias Keller (1813-1875) and performed on the opening day.

Participants included:
100 choral groups with a total of 10,926 singers
525 musicians with the orchestra
486 musicians with the wind band

See also
Handel and Haydn Society

References

Notes

Further reading
 William Dean Howells. Jubilee Days. Atlantic Monthly, Aug. 1869.

Patrick Sarsfield Gilmore: History of the National Peace Jubilee and Great Musical Festival: Held in the City of Boston 1869. Illustrated with Steel Engravings. Published 1871 by the Author and for Sale by Lee, Shepard, and Dillingham, New York

External links 

A History of the Wind Band
Patrick S. Gilmore and the Boston Peace Jubilees 
Announcement and Programme of the Festival 
Programme of the Second day June 16, 1869 and Third day June 17, 1869
List of Officers and Committees of the National Peace Jubilee Association
List of distinguished persons invited to the Jubilee – page 344-46
Official Programme for the five Days of the Festival page 432 ff

1869 in Massachusetts
19th century in Boston
Back Bay, Boston
Cultural history of Boston
Events in Boston
June 1869 events